Dorrel Rock is a rock outcrop 11 nautical miles (20 km) southwest of the summit of Mount Murphy, protruding through the ice near the head of Pope Glacier, on the Walgreen Coast, Marie Byrd Land. It was mapped by the United States Geological Survey from surveys and U.S. Navy air photos, 1959–66, and was named by the Advisory Committee on Antarctic Names after Leo E. Dorrel, U.S. Navy, a hospital corpsman with the Byrd Station winter party, 1966.

References 

Rock formations of Marie Byrd Land